The 2007–08 Ulster Rugby season was Ulster's 14th season since the advent of professionalism in rugby union, and their fourth under head coach Mark McCall. They competed in the Heineken Cup  and the Celtic League

Steve Williams joined as assistant coach at the beginning of the season. After a poor run of results, Mark McCall resigned as head coach in November 2007. Steve Williams took over on an interim basis, and Matt Williams was appointed as McCall's permanent replacement in December. Ulster finished bottom of their pool in the Heineken Cup, and second from bottom in the Celtic League. Tommy Bowe was Ulster's Player of the Year, and IRUPA Players' Player of the Year. David Humphreys, who retired at the end of the season, was inducted into the IRUPA Hall of Fame.

Squad

Senior squad

Players in (Season 2007/2008)
 Neil Hanna from Rotherham Titans
 Jarlath Carey from Rotherham Titans
 Seamus Mallon from Northampton Saints
 Carlo Del Fava from Bourgoin
 Simon Danielli from Border Reivers
 David Pollock from Ulster Academy
 Darren Cave from Ulster Academy
 Rob Dewey from Edinburgh
 Kieran Hallet from Bedford Blues
 Grant Webb from Toyota Verblitz

Players Out (Season 2007/2008)
 Andy Maxwell to Edinburgh
 Kevin Maggs to Bristol Rugby
 Paul Shields to Northampton Saints
 Scott Young to Doncaster Knights
 Lewis Stevenson to Exeter Chiefs
 John Andress to Exeter Chiefs

Academy squad

Heineken Cup

Pool 2

Celtic League

Home attendance

Ulster Rugby Awards

The Ulster Rugby Awards ceremony was held on 15 May 2008 at the La Mon House Hotel outside Belfast. Winners were:

Guinness Ulster Rugby Personality of the Year: David Humphreys
Bank of Ireland Ulster Player of the Year: Tommy Bowe
Vodafone Young Ulster Player of the Year: Niall O'Connor
Kukri Sportswear Club of the Year: City of Armagh RFC
First Trust Club Player of the Year: Ian Porter, QUB
Ken Goodall Award for Outstanding Player at the Sports Institute: Ian Whitten, QUB
Special Merit Award: Latimer Adair, Ballynahinch RFC
Calor Gas Youth Player of the Year: James Simpson, Ballynahinch RFC
Northern Bank Schools Player of the Year: Jonathan Shiells, Coleraine Academical Institution

References

2007-08
2007–08 in Irish rugby union
2007–08 Celtic League by team
2007–08 Heineken Cup by team